Zofia Wanda Leśniowska (née Sikorska; 2 March 1912 – 4 July 1943) was the daughter of Lieutenant-General Władysław Sikorski. She was a first lieutenant (porucznik) in the Polish Armed Forces. She died together with her father in the controversial 1943 Gibraltar B-24 crash.

Biography
On 30 September 1936 she married engineer Lt. Stanisław Leśniowski (1904 - 11 December 1987). She was active in the Polish Red Cross, and known for her passion for horse riding.

After World War II broke out, on 7 September 1939 Lt. Gen. Sikorski ordered her to organize a resistance movement. Her apartment on Górczewski's Street in Warsaw was used for a conspiracy movement. In January 1940 she was called as an emissary to France, and travelled as an underground courier, smuggling various documents. She was her father's personal secretary, coder, interpreter and advisor. She was decorated with the order of the Polish Red Cross; this was her only war time distinction. From 16 November 1942 to 18 February 1943 in London she was a superintendent of the Women's Auxiliary Service. She was killed, together with her father and nine others, when their plane crashed into the sea 16 seconds after takeoff from Gibraltar Airport at 23:07 on 4 July 1943. Her body was never found.

Death and remembrance
The deaths of General Sikorski and Zofia remain something of a mystery. Her presence alongside the General in those tragic days is associated with controversy and misunderstandings. It has been speculated that instead of dying in the crash, she was abducted and imprisoned in the Soviet camps near Moscow, and later in the interior of the country where she was allegedly seen by Polish officers, including special agent Tadeusz Kobyliński. Such speculations, however, remain in the realm of conspiracy theories, and as noted by Roman Wapiński in the Polish Biographical Dictionary, it is presumed Zofia died alongside her father in what was just an accident.

References

Further reading
 Córka generała, Rzeczpospolita, Rzeczpospolita, 31.07.2006 
 Kto porwał córkę Sikorskiego. Z Tadeuszem A. Kisielewskim  Rozmawia Adam Tycner , Rzeczpospolita, 09-06-2012 

1912 births
1943 deaths
Military personnel from Lviv
Polish Army officers
Polish female military personnel
Polish people of World War II
Polish military personnel of World War II
Red Cross personnel
Victims of aviation accidents or incidents in Gibraltar
Victims of aviation accidents or incidents in 1943
20th-century Polish women